The New England Lodge, at 634 N. High St. in Worthington, Ohio, was built in 1820.  It was asserted to be, in 1999, the Masonic lodge longest in use for Masonic purposes west of the Allegheny Mountains.

It was listed on the National Register of Historic Places in 1973.

In 2016, there were plans to convert much of the lodge building into condominiums, although reserving part to serve as a Masonic museum and offices.

References

Masonic buildings in Ohio
National Register of Historic Places in Franklin County, Ohio
Buildings and structures completed in 1820
High Street (Columbus, Ohio)